Aaron Ern-Wuei Phillips (born August 5, 1989) is an American mixed martial artist who competes in the Bantamweight division of the Ultimate Fighting Championship.

Background
His mom came over from Penang, Malaysia to the US for university and met his father. She was a school teacher, so every summer he would go back to Malaysia from the age of four to eleven.

Mixed martial arts career

Early career

Phillips started fighting MMA professionally in 2011, mainly for regional Louisiana organizations, compiling a 7–0 record, before signing with the UFC in 2014.

Ultimate Fighting Championship

Philips made his UFC debut as an injury replacement for Doo Ho Choi against Sam Sicilia on May 24, 2014 at UFC 173. However, Choi pulled out of the bout citing an injury.  He lost the fight via unanimous decision.

Aaron Phillips faced Matt Hobar at UFC Fight Night: Henderson vs. dos Anjos on August 23, 2014. He lost the fight via unanimous decision.

After his second loss in a row, Phillips was released from the UFC.

World Fighting Championships and Other Organizations

After his release from the UFC, Phillips faced future UFC fighter Chris Gutiérrez for the vacant WFC Bantamweight Championship. Due to the bay doors not being able to be closed, the fight took place in  cold. Due to an injury picked up during the fight, he was unable to continue, therefore losing the fight.

After this fight, due to injuries, he did not fight for 3 years before coming back in 2018 and picking up 4 straight wins in the World Fighting Championships organization. With a one off fight in VFL which he won by TKO, he was signed once again to the UFC.

Second stint in the UFC

With Anderson dos Santos testing positive for COVID-19 before his fight with Jack Shore at bantamweight, Phillips was chosen as his replacement for the July 16, 2020 fight at UFC on ESPN: Kattar vs. Ige He lost the fight in the second round via rear-naked choke.

Philips was scheduled to face Adrian Yanez on October 31, 2020 at UFC Fight Night 181. However on October 20, Phillips pulled out due to an undisclosed injury.

Phillips was scheduled to face Cameron Else on July 17, 2021 at UFC on ESPN 26. However in mid-July, Else pulled out to undisclosed reasons. Aaron was expected to face Trevin Jones on July 24, 2021 at UFC on ESPN: Sandhagen vs. Dillashaw. On July 18, Phillips pulled out off the bout.

Phillips was scheduled  to face Kris Moutinho on October 23, 2021 at UFC Fight Night 196. However, Moutinho was removed from the event for undisclosed reasons and was replaced by Jonathan Martinez. In turn, Philips withdrew from the bout due to illness.

Phillips is scheduled to face  Gastón Bolaños on April 15, 2023 at UFC on ESPN 44.

Endorsements 
On September 30, 2020 Aaron Phillips and BREMS Energy Solutions entered into an Exclusive Endorsement Deal ahead of his UFC Fight Night bout in Las Vegas on Oct. 31. The deal further secures a longstanding relationship with the two brands, BREMS & Headkicks Mixed Martial Arts & Fitness Club.

Mixed martial arts record

|-
| Loss
| align=center| 12–4
| Jack Shore
|Submission (rear-naked choke)
|UFC on ESPN: Kattar vs. Ige 
|
|align=center|2
|align=center|2:29
|Abu Dhabi, United Arab Emirates
|
|-
| Win
| align=center| 12–3
| Ariston Franca
| TKO
|VFL: Cajuns vs. Cowboys
| 
| align=center| 1
| align=center| 1:16
| Dallas, Texas, United States
| 
|-
| Win
| align=center| 11–3
| Devante Sewell
| Decision (unanimous)
| World Fighting Championships 101
| 
| align=center| 3
| align=center| 5:00
| Charenton, Louisiana, United States
| 
|-
| Win
| align=center| 10–3
| Anthony Retic
| Submission (rear-naked choke)
| World Fighting Championships 97
| 
| align=center| 1
| align=center| 1:49
| Charenton, Louisiana, United States
|
|-
| Win
| align=center| 9–3
| Jeremy Rogers
| TKO (punches)
| World Fighting Championships 86
| 
| align=center| 1
| align=center| 2:50
| Charenton, Louisiana, United States
|
|-
| Win
| align=center|8–3
| Andy Brossett
| TKO
|World Fighting Championships 82
| 
| align=center|1
| align=center|4:43
| Charenton, Louisiana, United States
|
|-
| Loss
| align=center|7–3
| Chris Gutiérrez
|TKO (retirement)
|World Fighting Championships 35
|
|align=center|3
|align=center|5:00
|Baton Rouge, Louisiana, United States
|
|-
| Loss
| align=center|7–2
| Matt Hobar
| Decision (unanimous)
| UFC Fight Night: Henderson vs. dos Anjos
| 
| align=center| 3
| align=center| 5:00
| Tulsa, Oklahoma, United States
| 
|-
| Loss
| align=center|7–1
| Sam Sicilia
|Decision (unanimous)
|UFC 173
|
|align=center| 3
|align=center| 5:00
|Las Vegas, Nevada, United States
|
|-
| Win
| align=center| 7–0
| Tyler Shinn
| Decision (split)
| C3 Fights: Border Wars 2014
| 
| align=center| 3
| align=center| 5:00
| Newkirk, Oklahoma, United States
| 
|-
| Win
| align=center| 6–0
| D.J. Fuentes
| Decision (unanimous)
| USA MMA 23: The Fight Before Christmas
|
| align=center| 3
| align=center| 5:00
|Lafayette, Louisiana, United States
| 
|-
| Win
| align=center| 5–0
| Joe Yeampierre
| Submission (rear-naked choke)
| WFC 12: Battle at the Belle
| 
| align=center| 1
| align=center| 1:52
| Baton Rouge, Louisiana, United States
| 
|-
| Win
| align=center| 4–0
| Micah Goss
| KO
| USA MMA 22: Lafayette vs. The World 2
| 
| align=center| 1
| align=center| 4:32
| Lafayette, Louisiana, United States
| 
|-
| Win
| align=center| 3–0
| Ryan Hollis
| Submission
| Night of Champions 4
| 
| align=center| 3
| align=center| 0:00
| Lafayette, Louisiana, United States
| 
|-
| Win
| align=center| 2–0
| John de Jesus
| Decision (unanimous)
| Global Fighting Alliance 17: Top Shelf Fights
| 
| align=center| 3
| align=center| 5:00
| Youngsville, Louisiana, United States
|
|-
| Win
| align=center| 1–0
| Heriberto Acuna
| KO (punches)
| Global Fighting Alliance: SugArena Rage
| 
| align=center| 1
| align=center| 1:26
| Baton Rouge, Louisiana, United States
|

See also 
 List of current UFC fighters
 List of male mixed martial artists

References

External links 
  
  

1989 births
Living people
American people of Malaysian descent
American male mixed martial artists
Bantamweight mixed martial artists
Mixed martial artists utilizing taekwondo
Ultimate Fighting Championship male fighters
American male taekwondo practitioners